Innisville, Ontario is a small village set in between the towns of Perth and Carleton Place, Ontario on what is known as Highway 7 or the Trans-Canada Highway. It lies about 15 miles from Perth, on the Mississippi River. The village is separated by the Mississippi River (via Mississippi Lake) into Innisville South and Innisville North.

History
Innisville was settled in the mid-to-late 1810s. The North side was settled first. The village grew around mills using the falls on the Mississippi. Other industries, as well as stores, were attracted to the area. The original name was Freer Falls, later changed to Ennisville and finally Innisville. A bridge was later built over the river.

References 

Communities in Lanark County